Tolstikov is a Russian surname, which may refer to
Yevgeny Tolstikov (1913–1987), Soviet polar explorer
3357 Tolstikov, asteroid named after Yevgeny Tolstikov
Vasily Tolstikov (1917–2003), Soviet diplomat and Communist Party official
Genrich Tolstikov (1933–2013), Russian chemist
Yakov Tolstikov (born 1959), Russian distance runner

Russian-language surnames